Lázaro Eduardo Borges Reid (born June 19, 1986) is Cuban pole vaulter.

Biography
Borges was born in Marianao, La Habana.  He has represented Cuba at 2008 Summer Olympics, but failed to advance to the Final. Borges won silver medal in 2011 World Championships with 5.90m, setting new Cuban record. His personal best before the competition was 5.75m.

He improved the Cuban indoor pole vault record in 2012 and cleared 5.72 m at the Pole Vault Stars meet.

At the 2012 Summer Olympics, he was trying to qualify for the final, when his pole broke into three large pieces (and at least two small ones) during his attempt to clear 5.35 m.

Achievements

Personal bests

References

External links 
 
 
 Ecured biography (in Spanish)

1986 births
Living people
Athletes from Havana
Cuban male pole vaulters
Olympic athletes of Cuba
Athletes (track and field) at the 2008 Summer Olympics
Athletes (track and field) at the 2012 Summer Olympics
Pan American Games gold medalists for Cuba
Pan American Games medalists in athletics (track and field)
Athletes (track and field) at the 2011 Pan American Games
Athletes (track and field) at the 2015 Pan American Games
Athletes (track and field) at the 2019 Pan American Games
Competitors at the 2006 Central American and Caribbean Games
Competitors at the 2014 Central American and Caribbean Games
Central American and Caribbean Games gold medalists for Cuba
World Athletics Championships athletes for Cuba
World Athletics Championships medalists
Central American and Caribbean Games medalists in athletics
Medalists at the 2011 Pan American Games
20th-century Cuban people
21st-century Cuban people